Orest Soltykevych (Ukrainian: Орест Солтикевич; born 1958) is a Ukrainian-Canadian conductor, currently conducting the Ukrainian Male Chorus of Edmonton and the Verkhovyna Ukrainian Choir. Orest is also a radio program announcer and producer at the CKUA Radio Network. Orest is the son of Roman Soltykewych.

Personal life
Orest was born and raised in Edmonton, Canada, where he completed Grade 9 of the Royal Conservatory Piano. He went on to attend the University of Alberta, where he completed a Bachelor of Education degree with a major in secondary music.

After the conclusion of his studies, Orest starting working for Edmonton Public Schools in various capacities, including as a computer studies teacher, instrumental music teacher, assistant principal, principal and substitute teacher.
 
Orest is married to Lesia Soltykevych, and has two sons, Roman and Cassian, and one daughter, Tamara.
Orest's father, Roman, was a choir conductor with the Ukrainian Dnipro Ensemble of Edmonton.

Musical career
In 1984 Orest became the founding conductor of the Ukrainian Male Chorus of Edmonton, a position which he holds today. Under his leadership the choir has embarked on a number of tours and performances in Canada, as well as internationally in Ukraine, Poland, Austria, Latvia, Spain, Portugal and the United States.

Starting in 1986, Orest began conducting the Ukrainian Youth Association of Canada (CYMK) choir, which he led for 7 years. He also spent three years as the conductor of the St Andrews's Ukrainian Orthodox Parish Choir. Orest is currently the director of the Verkhovyna Ukrainian Choir in Edmonton.

Over the course of his career, Orest has also performed with the Dnipro choir, the Richards Eaton singers, the Da Camera singers and the Kappella Kyrie Slavic Chamber Choir.

Orest spent ten years serving as a member of the Ukrainian Music Society, including acting as the society's president for a period of time.

Radio program hosting 

In 1999 Orest founded the “Sounds Ukrainian” radio program  at the CJSR radio station based out of the University of Alberta which he hosted for a total of seven years.

Orest currently hosts the Saturday Breakfast and Sunday Breakfast classical music programs on the CKUA Radio Network in Alberta.

Awards 

In 2005 Orest was awarded the Hetman Award by the Ukrainian Canadian Congress – Alberta Provincial Council for his many years of work in the Ukrainian community.

References 

1958 births
Living people
Canadian people of Ukrainian descent
Canadian choral conductors
20th-century Canadian conductors (music)
21st-century Canadian conductors (music)
Canadian radio hosts
Musicians from Edmonton
20th-century Canadian educators
21st-century Canadian educators
Canadian music educators
Musicians of the Ukrainian diaspora
Ukrainian conductors (music)